Canarium apertum is a tree in the family Burseraceae. The specific epithet  is from the Latin meaning "open", referring to the basal openings between petals.

Description
The scaly bark is grey-brown. The flowers are yellow-brown.

Distribution and habitat
Canarium apertum grows naturally in Sumatra, Peninsular Malaysia and Borneo. Its habitat is lowland mixed dipterocarp forest from sea-level to  altitude.

References

apertum
Trees of Sumatra
Trees of Peninsular Malaysia
Trees of Borneo
Plants described in 1932